Meximia is a genus of beetles in the family Cerambycidae, containing the following species:

 Meximia decolorata Pascoe, 1865
 Meximia perfusa Pascoe, 1865

References

Apomecynini